Decurion may refer to:

 Decurion (Roman cavalry officer), a Roman cavalry officer in command of a squadron
 Decurion (administrative), a member of a city or town council in ancient Rome

fr:Décurion